K III was a  patrol submarine of the Royal Netherlands Navy. The ship was built by De Schelde shipyard in Flushing.

Service history
The submarine was ordered in 1915 and 15 July that year K III was  laid down in Flushing at the shipyard of De Schelde. The launch took place on 12 August 1919.
On 9 July 1920 the ship is commissioned in the Dutch navy.

On 4 September 1920 K III began her journey to the Dutch East Indies, her theater of operations. She was the first submarine of the navy to make the journey without an escort. The route she took paused in Ferrol, Algiers, Malta, the Suez Canal, Aden and Colombo arriving at Tanjung Priok on 18 December 1920.

In 1934 K III was decommissioned.

References

External links
Description of ship

1919 ships
Ships built in Vlissingen
K III-class submarines